The Collège of Bernardins, or Collège Saint-Bernard, located no 20, rue de Poissy in the 5th arrondissement of Paris, is a former Cistercian college of the University of Paris. Founded by Stephen of Lexington, abbot of Clairvaux, and built from 1248 with the encouragement of Pope Innocent IV, it served until the French Revolution as the residence for the Cistercian monks who were studying at the University of Paris.

After an overall renovation completed in September 2008, it is now a place for meetings, dialogues, training and culture. It offers a program of public conferences and symposia, exhibitions, concerts, activities for young people and a theological and biblical studies center. The Ecole Cathédrale offers coursework on Christian thought and every year enrolls over 3,000 students in its courses. Since 2009, it has housed the Académie catholique de France.

It was listed as a French historical monument in 10 February 1871.

References, notes and bibliography

Bibliography

Collège des Bernardins 
 Directed by Vincent Aucante, Le Collège des Bernardins, Association du 18-24 Poissy, Paris, 2008  ; p. 256
 Pierre Engel, La résurrection du Collège des Bernardins, p. 198-209, dans le Bulletin Ouvrages métalliques, 6, 2010  ; p. 256

Medieval Monastic Orders 

 Henri-Irénée Marrou, L'église de l'Antiquité tardive (303-604), Éditions du Seuil (collection Points Histoires H81), Paris, 1985  ; p. 321
 Jean Chélini, Histoire religieuse de l'Occident médiéval, Hachette - Pluriel, Paris, 1991  ; p. 661
 Marcel Pacaut, Les ordres monastiques et religieux au Moyen Âge, Nathan, Paris, 1993  ; p. 256
 Directed by Jacques Berlioz, Moines et religieux au Moyen Âge, Éditions du Seuil (collection Points Histoire  H185), Paris, 1994  ; p. 346
 Jacques Paul, Le christianisme occidental au Moyen Âge. (IVth to XVth century), Armand Colin, Paris, 2004  ; p. 396
 Geneviève Bührer-Thierry, Charles Mériaux, Histoire de France. La France avant la France (481-888), Éditions Belin, Paris, 2010  ; p. 688

Parisian Colleges & Universities
 Jacques Verger, Les universités au Moyen Âge, puf (collection Quadrige, Paris, 2007  ; p. 226
 Aurélie Perraut, L'architecture des collèges parisiens au Moyen Âge, Presses universitaires Paris Sorbonne (collection cultures et civilisations médiévales 46), Paris, 2009  ; p. 467
 Michel Sot, Jean-Patrice Boudet, Anita Guerreau-Jalabert, Histoire culturelle de la France. Tome 1. Le Moyen Âge, Éditions du Seuil (collection Points Histoire H348), Paris, 2005  ; p. 472
 Jacques Le Goff, Les intellectuels au Moyen Âge, Éditions du Seuil (collection Points Histoire H78), Paris, 2000  ; p. 233

Cistercian culture 
 Directed by Julie Roux, Les cisterciens, MSM, Vic-en-Bigorre, 2003   ; p. 320
 Georges Duby, Saint Bernard. L'art cistercien, Arts et Métiers Graphiques, Paris, 1976  ; p. 222

References

13th-century Roman Catholic church buildings in France
Gothic architecture in France
Landmarks in France
Roman Catholic churches in the 5th arrondissement of Paris